Sewanee Natural Bridge in Franklin County, Tennessee, is a 25 feet (8 m) high natural sandstone arch with a span of 50 feet (15 m).  It is essentially a giant sinkhole partially eroded to form a large stone bridge. A wet weather spring located behind the bridge in a rock cave probably contributed to the  erosion forming the arch. It is called the Sewanee Natural Bridge as it was once owned by the University of the South in Sewanee, Tennessee.  It is a 3-acre (12,000 m2) designated state natural area.

The natural area is accessed via Highway Alt. 41. In Sewanee turn south onto Highway 56 and proceed 2.5 miles (4 km) to Natural Bridge Road. Turn left onto Natural Bridge Road and proceed ½ mile (800 m) to the parking area.

In popular culture
The Silver Jews named their album The Natural Bridge after it.

External links
Picture presentation of area around bridge
Sewanee Natural Bridge
Topo Map of Natural Bridge (pdf)
 Tennessee arches and natural bridges

Protected areas of Franklin County, Tennessee
Landmarks in Tennessee
Natural arches of Tennessee
Nature reserves in Tennessee
Landforms of Franklin County, Tennessee